The House of Działyński was a Polish noble family whose name comes from their original place of settlement, Działyń in Dobrzyń Land. They used the Ogończyk coat of arms.

History
The original head of the family was Piotr from Działyń (died 1441). During the 16th century the members of the Działyński family began moving from Kujawy into Royal Prussia. Their connections with the court of the King of Poland allowed them to quickly acquire senatorial positions in the Prussian Diet on the Prussian side of the family (the family had sixteen Prussian senators between the 15th and 18th centuries). In the second half of the 17th century some members began moving to Wielkopolska and over time this became the dominant line of the family. The last male member of the family, Jan Kanty Działyński died in 1880.

Notable members
Jan Działyński (1489–1587) - Stolnik of Dobrzyń, Castellan of Słońsk
Jan Działyński (1510–1583) - voivode of Chełm, Chamberlain of Gdańsk, Elbląg and Chełm
Paweł Działyński (1560–1609) -  Polish courtier, royal secretary, ambassador and governor of Bobrowniki and Radziejów.
Jan Działyński (1590–1648) - voivode of Chełm, Starosta of Puck
Paweł Jan Działyński (1594–1643) - voivode of Pomorze.
Jan Działyński (?-1692) - Castellan of Elbląg
Ignacy Działyński (1754–1797) - Polish nobleman and participant in the Warsaw Uprising of 1794
Augustyn Działyński (1715–1759) - voivode of Kalisz, cavalier of the Order of the White Eagle.
Ksawery Szymon Tadeusz Działyński (1756–1819) - senator and voivode of Duchy of Warsaw and Congress Poland.
Adam Tytus Działyński (1796–1861)- political activist and sponsor of the arts.
Jan Kanty Działyński (1829–1880) - Polish social and political activist.

Palaces

References

 Karin Friedrich, "The Other Prussia: Royal Prussia, Poland and Liberty, 1569-1772", Cambridge University Press, 2006, pg. 24,